The All-Night Vigil (Pre-reform Russian: Всенощное бдѣніе, Vsénoshchnoye bdéniye; Modern Russian: Всенощное бдение) is an a cappella choral composition by Sergei Rachmaninoff, his Op. 37, premiered on 23 March 1915 in Moscow.

The piece consists of settings of texts taken from the Russian Orthodox All-night vigil ceremony. It has been praised as Rachmaninoff's finest achievement and "the greatest musical achievement of the Russian Orthodox Church".  It was one of Rachmaninoff's two favorite compositions along with The Bells, and the composer requested that its fifth movement (Нынѣ отпущаеши, Nunc dimittis) be sung at his funeral.

The title of the work is often mis-translated as Vespers. This is both literally and conceptually incorrect as applied to the entire work; only the first six of its fifteen movements set texts from the Russian Orthodox canonical hour of Vespers.

History

Composition history
Rachmaninoff composed the All-Night Vigil in less than two weeks in January and February 1915. The All-Night Vigil is perhaps notable as one of two liturgical settings (the other being the Liturgy of St. John Chrysostom) by a composer who had stopped attending church services.  As required by the Russian Orthodox Church, Rachmaninoff based ten of the fifteen sections on chant.  However, the five original sections (numbers 1, 3, 6, 10, & 11) were so heavily influenced by chant that the composer called them "conscious counterfeits".

Rachmaninoff's work is a culmination of the preceding two decades of interest in Russian sacred music, as initiated by Tchaikovsky's setting of the all-night vigil. The similarities between the works, such as the extensive use of traditional chants, demonstrates the extent of Tchaikovsky's influence; however, Rachmaninoff's setting is much more complex in its use of harmony, textual variety and polyphony.

Performance history
The first performance was given in Moscow on March 10, 1915, partly to benefit the Russian war effort. Nikolai Danilin conducted the all-male Moscow Synodal Choir at the premiere.  It was received warmly by critics and audiences alike, and was so successful that it was performed five more times within a month.  However the Russian Revolution of 1917 and the rise of the Soviet Union led to the government condemnation of religious music, and on 22 July 1918 the Synodal Choir was replaced by a non-religious "People's Choir Academy".  It has been written that "no composition represents the end of an era so clearly as this liturgical work".

Individual movements of Rachmaninoff’s Vigil are incorporated by conductors into the actual sacred performance, or celebration (to use the proper Orthodox term), of the All-Night Vigil. On the night of April 2, 2022, Metropolitan Hilarion Alfeyev, celebrated a hierarchical All-Night Vigil that included all of the movements of Rachmaninoff’s work, incorporated with the complete order of the service.

Analysis
The Vigil includes three styles of chant: znamenny (in numbers 8, 9, 12, 13 and 14), a more recitational Greek style (numbers 2 and 15), and "Kiev" chant — a chant developed in Kiev in the 16th and 17th centuries (numbers 4 and 5).  Before writing, Rachmaninoff had studied ancient chant under Stepan Smolensky, to whom he dedicated the piece.  It is written for a four-part choir, complete with basso profondo.  However, in many parts there is three-, five-, six-, or eight-part harmony; at one point in the seventh movement, the choir is divided into eleven parts. Movements 4 and 9 each contain a brief tenor solo, while movements 2 and 5 feature lengthy solos respectively for alto and tenor.  The fifth movement, Nunc dimittis (Nyne otpushchayeshi), has gained notoriety for its ending in which the low basses must negotiate a descending scale that ends with a low B-flat (the third B-flat below middle C).  When Rachmaninoff initially played this passage through to Kastalsky and Danilin in preparation for the first performance, Rachmaninoff recalled that:
Danilin shook his head, saying, "Now where on earth are we to find such basses?  They are as rare as asparagus at Christmas!"  Nevertheless, he did find them.  I knew the voices of my countrymen...

Movements

Note: Numbers 1–6 contain settings from the Russian Orthodox Vespers service (Večérnja), numbers 7–14 settings from Matins (Утреня, Útrenja), and number 15 from The First Hour (Первый час, Pérvyj čas).

Recordings

The first recording of the Vigil was made by Alexander Sveshnikov with the State Academic Russian Choir of the USSR for the Soviet Melodiya label in 1965 – exactly half a century after the work's first performance.  Because of Soviet anti-religious policies, this record was never available for sale within the USSR, but was only made for the export market and private study. This recording still has a legendary reputation, in part because of its extremely strong low basses, but also because of the solos by Klara Korkan and Konstantin Ognevoi. The recording was first released in the United States in 1973 on the Melodiya-Angel label.  The March 1974 edition of Stereo Review noted that Angel's general manager Robert E. Myers had "tracked down the recording" and "had to prevail rather heavily on the Soviet powers that be to make it part of their trade agreement with Angel".

In popular culture
The Russian feminist protest punk rock group Pussy Riot used the sixth movement as the basis for its protest song "Mother of God, Chase Putin Away".

References

External links
 Rachmaninoff Vespers: Transliteration and translation
 
 Rhodes College Mastersingers, directed by Tony Lee Garner, live recording from February,1998 at St. Mary's Cathedral, Memphis Tennessee. Free mp3s of complete performance
 All-Night Vigil of Rachmaninoff in Russian at Predanie.ru archive

Compositions by Sergei Rachmaninoff
Choral compositions
1915 compositions
Eastern Orthodox liturgical music
Magnificat settings
United States National Recording Registry recordings